Bo-Dyn Bobsled Project, Inc. is a bobsled constructor, founded in 1992 by former NASCAR driver and 1986 Daytona 500 winner Geoff Bodine, to collaborate in the design, manufacture and supply of U.S.-built racing sleds for the United States Bobsled and Skeleton Federation (USBSF). 

The project is classified as a 501(c)(3) non-profit organization. Its sleds are built in NASCAR Cup Series driver Joey Logano's Huntersville, North Carolina race shop.

History

Geoff Bodine was watching the 1992 Winter Olympics when he noticed the American team struggling in the bobsled event.  At the time, the United States had not won an Olympic bobsled medal since 1956, and was using substandard sleds imported from Europe. Bodine was invited to Lake Placid to visit the team and take part in demonstration runs. Bodine stated afterwards, "When I heard that our athletes weren't using American-made bobsleds, that was unacceptable." Bodine stated about the project, "I'm glad we did it. No regrets. Not one regret. It's all about 'Made in the USA.' I'm a believer, I love our country . . . and the foundation of our country."

Bodine partnered with race-car builder Bob Cuneo to build sleds. Bodine had recently purchased the assets of AK Racing, and used his leverage and connections as a NASCAR car owner to begin fundraising for the project. The project, known as Bo-Dyn ("Bo" for Bodine, "Dyn" for Chassis Dynamics), started having its sleds used by the U.S. team in 1994.

In 2000, Whelen Engineering Company joined the project as sponsors, while Whelen Vice President Phil Kurze became the project's President the following year.

In 1998, only the program's second Olympics, the four-man sled missed out on the bronze medal by a mere 0.02 seconds. In 2002, the team won three bobsled medals. A gold in the women's competition, as well as a silver and bronze in the four-man sled.

The project later constructed the "Night Train" sled, the fastest sled in the world. Kurze stated that Night Train cost more than $250,000 to build. In the 2010 Winter Olympics, the United States used the sled to win its first gold medal since 1948. When asked about the win, Bodine stated,

On April 30, 2011, Bo-Dyn and the USBSF ended its partnership due to intellectual property disagreements, and BMW became the new bobsled provider. Subsequent litigation between the two parties was dropped in 2013. The same year, Bo-Dyn began working on the Night Train 2, which was designed using carbon fiber instead of Kevlar and fiberglass, as carbon fiber provides improved weight distribution. Night Train 2 was used by the U. S. team in the 2014 Winter Olympics.

Bo-Dyn served as Bodine's sponsor in the E-Z-GO 200 Camping World Truck Series race in 2010.

Geoff Bodine Bobsled Challenge
From 2006 to 2010, the Geoff Bodine Bobsled Challenge was held, with funds raised going to the Bo-Dyn project. Various NASCAR drivers entered the event, along with NHRA drivers. The inaugural event in 2006 was won by Boris Said along with his brakeman Ryan Johnston, Boris would go on to win the 2007 and 2008 events as well while Todd Bodine and Morgan Lucas won the next challenge. The 2010 challenge was won by Joey Logano. On December 21, 2010, it was announced that the challenge would be discontinued.

Results

Olympics

Bobsleigh World Cup
Combined men's
 Gold: 2006–07
 Silver: 1996–97
 Bronze: 2003–04, 2005–06, 2007–08, 2010–11
Two-man
 Gold: 2006–07
 Bronze: 1996–97,  2005–06
Four-man
 Gold: 2009–10
 Silver: 2006–07, 2010–11
 Bronze: 2003–04
Two-woman
 Gold: 1999–00, 2000–01
 Silver: 1998–99, 1999-00, 2003–04, 2006–07
 Bronze: 2000–01, 2001–02, 2005–06

References

External links
 

Charities based in North Carolina
Bobsleigh in the United States
Vehicle manufacturing companies established in 1992
Companies based in North Carolina
Bodine family
1992 establishments in North Carolina